Tinissa torvella is a moth of the family Tineidae. It was described by Francis Walker in 1864. It is found in Sri Lanka.

References

Moths described in 1864
Scardiinae